Connor Weil is an American actor. He is best known for his role as Will Belmont on the first season of MTV's Scream.

Career
In April 2016, Weil was revealed to have joined the cast of the NBC Daytime soap opera Days of Our Lives.

Filmography

Television

References

External links
 
 

1993 births
Living people
American male television actors
American male soap opera actors
Male actors from Portland, Oregon